R9 TV is a Hindi-language regional news channel that is broadcast in Uttar Pradesh and Uttarakhand. It was launched on Sept 12, 2019 and is available on Tata Sky, Airtel, Dish TV and others. Amitabh Agnihotri is editor-in-chief for the channel. On September 22, 2020, Umesh Kumar joined R9 TV as news director and chief executive officer.

Founders 
With a motto of Rashtradharm Sarvapratham and a mission to become the voice of the nation, this channel was started by 4 entrepreneurs:
 Avinash Kumar
 Karan Mohan
 Vinod Singh
 Sunil Tripathy

References 

Hindi-language television channels in India
Mass media in Uttar Pradesh
Mass media in Uttarakhand
24-hour television news channels in India